Adam's Testament is a Canadian 2017 drama film directed by Jason Barbeck and Rafael Kalamat. It premiered in theaters of Canada on April 18, 2017. The film stars Philip Moran, Luke Bilyk, Nick Mancuso, Frank Chiesurin and Zoé De Grand Maison.

Premise
After the tragic death of his mother, Adam takes refuge even more in music with his band and his girlfriend. His father, Joseph, who works as a detective, is faced with the mission of saving Adam's soul, since angels and demons disguise themselves as humans. This ancient spiritual war between good and evil will put Adam's faith to the test, while an unknown being full of darkness descends to Toronto to further damage this war.

Cast
Philip Moran as Joseph Gable
Luke Bilyk as Adam Gable
Nick Mancuso as The Stranger
Frank Chiesurin as Archangel Michael
Zoé De Grand Maison as Katia
Kate Drummond as Katherine Gable
Art Hindle as Father Callaghan

Production
On July 6, 2015, it was announced that Jason Barbeck and Rafael Kalamat would direct and produce a supernatural thriller film Adam's Testament and they hired a group of Ryerson University students to be part of the film's technical team. It was also announced that it was starring Luke Bilyk and Zoé De Grand Maison. Later they joined the main cast Philip Moran, Nick Mancuso, Kate Drummond, Art Hindle and Frank Chiesurin. Principal photography on the film finish on July 30, 2015 in Toronto, Ontario.

Reception
The website dove.org has given Adam's Testament a positive review, calling it a "captivating film that portrays the spiritual conflicts between good and evil, the symbolism of the angels and the demons in this story convincingly illustrates the battle and the actors are so very powerful in their interpretation as effective in their roles".

Accolades

References

External links
 

Canadian drama films
English-language Canadian films
2017 drama films
2010s English-language films
2010s Canadian films